The Channel V Oz Artist of the Year was an annual award presented by Channel V Australia and is voted by the Australian public, and is awarded to the artist on the same day as the annual ARIA Music Awards presentation events. Since its inauguration in 1997, Silverchair has won the Artist of the Year award for six consecutive years, from 1997 to 2002.

Channel [V] Oz Artist of the Year award

1997
Jebediah
Tina Arena
Crowded House
Savage Garden
Silverchair

1998
Grinspoon
Savage Garden
Regurgitator
The Living End
Silverchair

1999
Powderfinger
Silverchair
Frenzal Rhomb
Human Nature
The Living End

2000
Silverchair
Killing Heidi
Powderfinger
Bardot
Savage Garden

2001
Silverchair
Powderfinger
Something For Kate
Bardot
Kylie Minogue

2002
Silverchair
John Butler Trio 
Kylie Minogue 
Grinspoon
Darren Hayes

2003
Delta Goodrem
Silverchair
Powderfinger
Something For Kate
Grinspoon

2004
Guy Sebastian
Jet
Delta Goodrem
Grinspoon
John Butler Trio

2005
Anthony Callea
Kisschasy
Missy Higgins
The Veronicas

2006
Eskimo Joe 
Rogue Traders
The Veronicas
Wolfmother

2007
Silverchair
Evermore
The Veronicas
Kisschasy

2008
The Getaway Plan
Short Stack
The Living End
Kisschasy
The Veronicas

2009
 Bliss N Eso
 Empire Of The Sun
 Kisschasy
 Short Stack

2010
Bliss n Eso
Short Stack
John Butler Trio
Amy Meredith

2011

 360
 Guy Sebastian
 New Empire
 Short Stack

2012

 Ball Park Music
 Delta Goodrem
 Reece Mastin
 Seth Sentry

2013

5 Seconds of Summer

2014

 5 Seconds of Summer
 The Amity Affliction
 Troye Sivan

See also

 List of Australian music television shows

References

External links

Australian music awards
Awards established in 1997
1997 establishments in Australia
Channel V Australia original programming